Stand By Your Man is an American sitcom that aired on Fox from April 5, 1992 to May 17, 1992. The series was developed by Nancy Steen and Neil Thompson, who also wrote some of the episodes. It is notable for being Melissa Gilbert's return to series television after the conclusion of Little House on the Prairie nine years earlier, and the first lead sitcom role for Rosie O'Donnell, who was then on the verge of breaking into major fame.

The series was created as an American adaptation of the British sitcom Birds of a Feather, which was still in production at the time.

Synopsis
The show's premise, as narrated in the opening credits by Fox network's chief announcer Joe Cipriano in a deadpan comical fashion, was that two sisters, earthy Rochelle Dunphy (Gilbert) and loud, crass Lorraine Popowski (O'Donnell) agreed to live together for emotional and moral support while their husbands were doing time in prison for robbery. Rochelle was a trophy wife who had married Roger Dunphy (Sam McMurray), a former working stiff who had become wealthy, supposedly as a successful manufacturer of sunroom and patio furniture. As the narrator said about Rochelle "One sister married a business owner and lived in the lap of luxury", while the camera focuses on Roger's palatial home in Franklin Heights, New Jersey. She thought her life of luxury was near perfect until her husband was discovered to have committed a series of major bank robberies. (Roger had in fact owed much of his wealth, and the money he spoiled Rochelle with, to robbing banks.) Lorraine had married blue-collar slob Artie Popowski (Rick Hall) in a shot-gun ceremony in Las Vegas. Cipriano introduced Lorraine by saying "the other sister married a no-good bum, and well, you get the picture", as the camera focuses on a doublewide. Rochelle and Lorraine are watching TV one day when a breaking news story shows two men captured red-handed in a midtown bank heist, then react with shock as they are unmasked to be Artie and Roger. Both men were sentenced to eight years in the state penintentiary, which was close to Franklin Heights, so both husbands were frequently featured in contact with their wives at the visitor's center. Roger revealed his patio business flourished for a time, but was in danger of bankruptcy and he resorted to crime to keep up the charade of wealth, whilst Artie had gambled away his meager assets at the dog track and resorted to crime to provide for Lorraine (albeit scantily).

Since most of Roger's wealth was re-claimed by their respective banks upon his and Artie's sentencing, Rochelle and Lorraine were suddenly faced with financial problems. Artie's trailer was repossessed, so Lorraine had no choice but to move into Rochelle in Roger's home, which was proven to have been acquired legally. The former was reluctant to find a job, after living off Roger for so long; the latter worked at Bargain Circus, a retail store, helping the two get by. Gloria (Rusty Schwimmer) and Sophie (Ellen Ratners) were Lorraine's co-workers at the store. Ironically, one time when Lorraine demanded the timid Rochelle get a job, it turned out to backfire on her. Earlier, the manager got fired for groping Lorraine, and learned the new manager was someone who impressed corporate headquarters with her self-confidence: Rochelle.

Adrienne Stone (Miriam Flynn) was the status-conscious next door neighbor who resented everything having to do with the sisters' living arrangement. Adrienne was convinced that Lorraine was helping to bring down the value of the neighborhood, never missed an opportunity to make the imprisoned husbands a subject of conversation, and in addition, had something hypocritical to hide. Lorraine's biker friend Scab (Donald Gibb), a rough but good-hearted guy, caught the eye of Adrienne, and she started an affair with him. She easily convinced Scab to become a kept man and getting her friends to think he was some kind of pro athlete or sea captain, and his fancy new attire such as a tuxedo impresses Lorraine. Their relationship was openly revealed to everyone before the end of the series' short run.

In every episode, Rochelle and Lorraine also visited their husbands in prison. Much of the key conflict between the sisters occurred here; Rochelle could not be apart from Roger for too long, since they were still madly in love; Lorraine, who still stood by Artie, vented her anger towards Roger, but also expressed anger at Artie for being an accomplice and in her own sardonic way, hoped his imprisonment could help him reform.

Cast
Melissa Gilbert as Rochelle Dunphy
Rosie O'Donnell as Lorraine Popowski	
Sam McMurray as Roger Dunphy
Rick Hall as Artie Popowski
Rusty Schwimmer as Gloria
Ellen Ratners as Sophie
Miriam Flynn as Adrienne Stone

Episodes

Scheduling
Stand by Your Man was Fox's attempt to finally add power to the latter half of their Sunday night lineup, building upon the success of the shows that aired earlier that night. At this time, Fox still scheduled Sunday programming up until 11/10c, and hoped that the broad, somewhat raunchy nature of Stand by Your Man would draw a sizeable audience for the 10/9c slot. The network also saw the series as its "next big Married...With Children" (many critics claimed Stand by Your Man outdid Married... with the style of its writing).

For the show's original episode run, and for two weeks beyond, it aired at 10/9c on Sundays. Fox officially canceled the series in May. The show then moved into the 10:30/9:30c slot on the same evening, in mid-June: after two more months of summer reruns, Stand by Your Man had its last network airing on August 9, 1992.

Theme song
The show's title was taken from the Tammy Wynette song of the same name; though neither the song itself nor a variation of it was used in the series.

Reception

The show was critically panned by television critics.

References

External links
 

Fox Broadcasting Company original programming
1990s American sitcoms
1992 American television series debuts
1992 American television series endings
American television series based on British television series
Television shows set in New Jersey
English-language television shows
Television series by 20th Century Fox Television